Suratha (23 November 1921 – 20 June 2006) was a Tamil poet, recognized for his poetic use of similes. He was called "Uvamai Kavignar" ("poet of comparisons").

Early life
Suratha was born in Thanjavur, Tamil Nadu as T. Rajagopal on 23 November 1921. He derived his pen name from Subburathnadasan (Bharathidasan, a poet of yesteryear).

Literary works
Saavin Mutham (meaning "kiss of death") and Thenmazhai (meaning "rain of honey") were among his notable works. He also ran a weekly Kaavyam, entirely dedicated to poetry.

Another of his popular lyric was the philosophical Aadi adangum vaazhkaiyada, which was featured in the Tamil movie 'Neer Kumizhi' (Water bubble), released in 1965.

Filmography

As writer
Amarakavi (1952)

As lyricist

Amarakavi (1952)
En Thangai (1952)
Anbu (1953)
Genova (1953)
Ammaiyappan (1954)
Kathanayaki (1955)
Pudhu Vazhvu (1957)
Boologa Rambai (1958)
Nadodi Mannan (1958)
Thai Pirandhal Vazhi Pirakkum (1958)
Thirumanam (1958)
Abalai Anjugam (1959)
Nalla Theerpu (1959)
Thalai Koduthaan Thambi (1959)
Aadi Perukku (1962)
Naanal (1965)
Neerkumizhi (1965)
Major Chandrakanth (1966)
Marakka Mudiyumaa? (1966)
Netru Indru Naalai (1974)

Awards
He received the Kalaimamani award in 1972 and the Bharatidasan award in 1990.

References

Tamil poets
Tamil activists
1921 births
2006 deaths
Indian male poets
Tamil writers
20th-century Indian poets
People from Thanjavur
Poets from Tamil Nadu
20th-century Indian male writers